David Foster: Off the Record is a 2019 Canadian documentary film, directed by Barry Avrich. The film profiles influential Canadian record producer David Foster, through a mix of archival footage and interviews with Foster, his family, and musicians who have worked with him including Barbra Streisand, Lionel Richie, Michael Bublé, Céline Dion, Quincy Jones, Clive Davis, Josh Groban, Kristin Chenoweth, Peter Cetera, Diane Warren and Carol Bayer Sager.

The film premiered at the 2019 Toronto International Film Festival as a TIFF Special Event. Following its television broadcast in 2020, it received a Canadian Screen Award nomination for Best Biography or Arts Documentary Program or Series at the 9th Canadian Screen Awards in 2021.

References

External links

2019 films
Canadian documentary films
Documentary films about pop music and musicians
2010s English-language films
2010s Canadian films
Films directed by Barry Avrich